Katsushi Boda (sometimes spelled 'Bowda') is a Japanese stop motion animator. He is most famous for creating the character Robot Palta.

While much of his work is for advertisements, he has made several works of independent animation, including Pulsar (1990),  Form of Stress (1992), Robot Apartments (:ja:ロボットパルタ) (1994 anime series), and Kiadoryoku REAL (1998). Many of his films feature a gear motif, and utilize pixilation and replacement-series animation.

In 1999 his film Kiadoryoku REAL won the Special Jury Prize in the Off Theatre Competition at the 10th Yubari International Fantastic Film Festival.

In 2003, he participated in the collaborative project Winter Days.

Notes

External links
  
 Katsushi Boda at Media Arts Database 

Japanese animators
Anime directors
Stop motion animators
Living people
Year of birth missing (living people)